Bob McDonald (25 February 1895 – 1971) was a professional footballer who played for Inverness Caledonian, Tottenham Hotspur and Clapton Orient.

Football career 
McDonald joined Spurs from Inverness Caledonian in 1919. Playing as a full back, he made a total of 125 appearances in all competitions in his time at White Hart Lane. The highlight of his Tottenham career was to be a member of the winning 1921 FA Cup Final team. He moved to Clapton Orient in 1927 and went on to play a further 37 matches.

Honours 
Tottenham Hotspur
FA Cup: 1920–21

References 

1895 births
1971 deaths
Footballers from Inverness
Scottish footballers
Tottenham Hotspur F.C. players
Leyton Orient F.C. players
Association football fullbacks
Caledonian F.C. players
English Football League players
FA Cup Final players
Highland Football League players